Chris Adams may refer to:

Sports
 Chris Adams (footballer) (1927–2012), English footballer
 Chris Adams (wrestler) (1955–2001), English judoka and professional wrestler
 Chris Adams (cricketer) (born 1970), English cricketer
 Chris Adams (rugby league) (born 1986), Australian rugby league footballer

Music
 Chris Adams (Scottish musician) (1944–2016), of the Scottish folk band String Driven Thing
 Chris Adams (UK musician), of the UK post-rock band Hood
 Chris "Cid" Adams, American bassist, former member of the heavy metal band Byzantine
 Chris Adams (American drummer), former drummer with the punk band Riverboat Gamblers

Other
 Chris Adams (general) (born 1930), American author and Air Force officer
 Chris Adams (character), The Magnificent Seven leader
 Christopher Adams (scientist), African American scientist, and biotechnology CEO

See also
 Christine Adams (disambiguation)
Adams (surname)